Henry Lewis Benning (April 2, 1814 – July 10, 1875) was a general in the Confederate States Army. He also was a lawyer, legislator, and judge on the Georgia Supreme Court. He commanded "Benning's Brigade" during the American Civil War. Following the Confederacy's defeat at the end of the war, he returned to his native Georgia, where he lived out the rest of his life. Fort Benning was named after him, but that base has since been renamed Fort Moore to honor retired Lt. Gen. Harold “Hal” and Julia Moore for their contributions to the U.S. Army.

Early life and education
Benning was born on a plantation in Columbia County, Georgia, owned by his parents Pleasant Moon and Malinda Meriwether White Benning, the third of eleven children. He attended Franklin College (now the University of Georgia), graduating in 1834. While a student, he was a member of the Phi Kappa Literary Society. After college, he moved to Columbus, Georgia, which would be his home for the rest of his life. He was admitted to the bar at the age of 21.

Career
Benning was active in Southern U.S. politics and an ardent secessionist, bitterly opposing abolition and the emancipation of slaves. In a letter to Howell Cobb written in July 1849, he stated that a Southern Confederacy would not be enough because it might itself eventually become divided into northern and southern regions as slavery waned in some of the states, and he called for a Southern "consolidated Republic" that "will put slavery under the control of those most interested in it."

In 1851, he was nominated for the U.S. Congress as a Southern rights Democrat but was not elected. In 1853, he was elected an associate justice of the Georgia Supreme Court, where he was noted for an opinion that held that a state supreme court is not bound by the decisions of the U.S. Supreme Court on constitutional questions but that the two courts must be held to be "coordinate and co-equal."

Following the election of Abraham Lincoln to the U.S. presidency in 1860 on a platform opposing the expansion of slavery into the territories, Benning took an active part in the state convention that voted to secede from the Union, representing Muscogee County. In March 1861, the Southern states that had seceded appointed special commissioners to travel to the other slaveholding Southern states that had yet to secede. Benning was the commissioner from Georgia to the Virginian secession convention in which he tried to persuade Virginian politicians to vote to join Georgia in seceding from the Union. In a February 1861 speech to the Virginian secession convention, Benning gave his reasoning for the urging of secession from the Union, appealing to ethnic prejudices and pro-slavery sentiments to present his case and saying that were the slave states to remain in the Union their slaves would ultimately end up being freed by the anti-slavery Republican Party. He stated that he would rather be stricken with illness and starvation than see African Americans liberated from slavery and be given equality as citizens:

American Civil War
Although he was considered for a cabinet position in the government of the newly-established Confederacy, he chose to join the Confederate army instead and became the colonel of the 17th Georgia Infantry, a regiment that he raised himself in Columbus on August 29, 1861. The regiment became part of Robert Toombs's brigade in the right wing of the Army of Northern Virginia, under General Robert E. Lee.

As a newly minted army officer, Benning immediately ran into political difficulty. He questioned the legality of the Confederate government's Conscription Act and spoke against it openly as a violation of states' rights. Refusing to obey certain orders, he came close to being court-martialed, but influence from his friend, Colonel T. R. R. Cobb, defused the situation. The first significant action he saw was at the Second Battle of Bull Run in August 1862. At the Battle of Antietam, Benning's brigade was a crucial part in the defense of the Confederate right flank, guarding "Burnside's Bridge" across Antietam Creek all morning against repeated Union assaults. His courage in battle was no longer questioned by his superiors, and he became known as the "Old Rock" to his men. He was promoted to brigadier general on April 23, 1863, with date of rank of January 17, 1863.

For most of the rest of the war, Benning continued as a brigade commander ("Benning's Brigade") in the division of the aggressive John Bell Hood of Texas. He missed the Confederate victory at the Battle of Chancellorsville because his brigade was stationed in southern Virginia along with the rest of Lieutenant General James Longstreet's First Corps. However, it returned for active combat in the Battle of Gettysburg. There, on July 2, 1863, Benning led his brigade in a furious assault against the Union position in the Devil's Den, driving out the defenders at no small cost to themselves. That September, Longstreet's Corps was sent west to assist General Braxton Bragg's Army of Tennessee. On the second day of the bloody Battle of Chickamauga, Benning participated in Longstreet's massive charge against a gap in the Union line even as his horse was shot out from under him. He mounted another horse, which was also killed. Finally, he cut loose a horse from a nearby artillery battery and rode into combat bareback. During a surprise Union counterattack against his brigade, many of his men fled, and Benning ran off to Longstreet to report the calamity. Riding an old artillery horse and whipping it with a piece of rope, Benning was "greatly excited and the very picture of despair," as was reported by Longstreet after the war. Benning said, "General, I am ruined; my brigade was suddenly attacked and every man killed; not one is to be found. Please give me orders where I can do some fighting." Longstreet responded impassively, "Nonsense, General, you are not so badly hurt. Look about you. I know you will find at least one man, and with him on his feet report your brigade to me, and you two shall have a place in the fighting line." Longstreet's reply humiliated Benning but instilled enough determination in him to return to find his brigade and prevail in the battle.

The Benning's Brigade fought at the Battle of Wauhatchie outside Chattanooga, Tennessee, and joined Longstreet's Corps in its unsuccessful Knoxville Campaign in late 1863. Returning to Virginia, the brigade fought against Union Lieutenant General Ulysses S. Grant in the 1864 Overland Campaign, where Benning was severely wounded in the left shoulder during the Battle of the Wilderness on May 5. That wound kept him out of the remainder of the campaign and much of the subsequent Siege of Petersburg, but he was able to return in time for the waning days of that lengthy campaign. His brigade withstood strong Union assaults against its entrenchments but was forced to withdraw along with the rest of Lee's army in the retreat to Appomattox Court House in early April 1865. Benning, heartbroken, was one of the final officers to lead his men to the surrender ceremony.

Later life and death

After the war, Benning returned to Columbus to resume the practice of law. He found that his house had been burned; all of his savings had disappeared; and he had to support, along with his own family, the widow, and children of his wife's brother, who had been killed in the war.

In 1875, Benning had a stroke, termed apoplexy at the time, on his way to court and died in Columbus. He is buried in Linwood Cemetery.

Personal life
On September 12, 1839, Benning married Mary Howard Jones of Columbus, Georgia. Mary was the daughter of the Honorable Seaborn Jones, a prominent attorney, former Georgia Secretary of State, and United States Representative. Henry and Mary were married for twenty-nine years. Years before Margaret Mitchell published her Civil War novel, Gone with the Wind, she wrote an article in the Atlanta Constitution (December 20, 1925) in which she referenced the Benning family and their experiences during the war.

Regarding Mary Benning, Ms. Mitchell wrote, "She was a tiny woman, frail and slight, but possessed of unusual endurance and a lion’s heart. The battles she fought at home were those of nearly every Southern woman, but her burdens were heavier than most. Left in complete charge of a large plantation, this little woman, who was the mother of ten children, was as brave a soldier at home as ever her husband was on the Virginia battlefields. She saw to it that the crops were gathered, the children fed and clothed, and the Negroes cared for. To her fell the work of superintending the weaving and spinning of enough cloth, not only to clothe her own children and servants, but also Confederate soldiers. While her husband was away she buried her aged father, whose end was hastened by the war."

Following her research and article on the Bennings, Mitchell wrote her novel of the Civil War, and many of her descriptions of the Bennings are reflected in the lives of the O'Haras and others.

Shortly after the Civil War, Mary Benning died suddenly on June 28, 1868. Henry's firstborn son, Seaborn Jones Benning, died of consumption on December 12, 1874. As a widower, Henry Benning suffered a stroke and died on July 10, 1875. The couple had a total of ten children, including an infant son who died within hours of birth and three daughters (Sarah Elizabeth, Caroline Matilda and Anna Malinda) who died of childhood diseases. Five Benning daughters (Mary Howard, Augusta Jones, Louisa Vivian, Anna Caroline, and Sarah Jones) survived their parents.

While all of Benning's daughters were accomplished women, it is noteworthy that Louisa Vivian was married to Samuel Spencer. Spencer served as a young cavalryman during the Civil War and rode under the command of General Nathan Bedford Forrest. After the war, Spencer attained great prominence as a railroad tycoon, and he is known today as the "Father of the Southern Railroad System."

Legacy
The U.S. Army installation Fort Benning was named after Benning. It is home to the U.S. Army Infantry School and is located near Columbus, Georgia. During World War II, a Liberty Ship was named in honor of Benning. The S.S. Henry L. Benning, United States Merchant Marine 0946, was built in Baltimore, Maryland and went into service on March 9, 1943. The ship hauled cargo and troops throughout the Pacific theater. Few Liberty Ships survive to the present day, not including the Benning.

In 2020, during the George Floyd protests, there were renewed calls to rename U.S. Army installations named after Confederate soldiers, including Fort Benning.
 Fort Benning was renamed Fort Moore in honor of Lt. Gen. Hal Moore and his wife Julia Compton Moore on May 11, 2023.

See also

 Confederate States of America, causes of secession, "Died of states' rights"
 List of American Civil War generals (Confederate)
 List of signers of the Georgia Ordinance of Secession

References

Additional sources 
 Dameron, J. David. General Henry Lewis Benning: A Biography of Georgia's Supreme Court Justice and Confederate General.  Heritage Books: Westminster, Maryland: 2008.
 Eicher, John H., and David J. Eicher. Civil War High Commands. Stanford, CA: Stanford University Press, 2001. .
 Freeman, Douglas S. Lee's Lieutenants: A Study in Command. 3 vols. New York: Scribner, 1946. .
 Hewitt, Lawrence C. "Henry Lewis Benning." In The Confederate General, vol. 1, edited by William C. Davis and Julie Hoffman. Harrisburg, PA: National Historical Society, 1991. .
 Kane, Sharyn, and Richard Keeton. Fort Benning, the Land and the People . National Park Service.
 Sorrel, G. Moxley. Recollections of a Confederate Staff Officer. Boston: Neale Publishing, 1905.
 Tagg, Larry. The Generals of Gettysburg. Campbell, CA: Savas Publishing, 1998. .
 Warner, Ezra J. Generals in Gray: Lives of the Confederate Commanders. Baton Rouge: Louisiana State University Press, 1959. .

External links

 Online biography
 
 Henry L. Benning-Seaborn Jones Collection (MC 6) at Columbus State University Archives

1814 births
1875 deaths
People from Columbia County, Georgia
Confederate States Army brigadier generals
People from Columbus, Georgia
University of Georgia alumni
Justices of the Supreme Court of Georgia (U.S. state)
People of Georgia (U.S. state) in the American Civil War
Signers of the Georgia Ordinance of Secession
19th-century American judges